Colstrip High School (CHS) is the only high school in Colstrip, Montana, in the United States.  It has one of the largest bus districts in the nation, including locations as far away as Ashland, Montana. Nestled in the foothills of Colstrip, the school contains an indoor pool, racquetball court, wrestling room, basketball gymnasium, weight lifting room and overlooks a public recreation area with baseball diamonds and golf course.  It has lab spaces to support sciences, audiovisual technology, and the arts, including a theater.

Academics
Academically, Colstrip hosts a number of advanced placement courses. In 2008, Colstrip High School had 243 enrolled students, and $1.54M in state funding.

Athletics
Colstrip's mascots are the Colts and Fillies and the school uniforms are black, dark green and metallic gold. The Colts and Fillies play in the 3B conference with the Baker High School Spartans, Forsyth High School Dogies, Lame Deer High School Morningstars, St. Labre High School Braves, and Broadus High School Hawks.

References

External links
Test Statistics

Public high schools in Montana
Schools in Rosebud County, Montana
1924 establishments in Montana